Alba Iulia (or Carlsburg, formerly Weißenburg;) is a city that serves as the seat of Alba County in the west-central part of Romania. Located on the Mureș River in the historical region of Transylvania, it has a population of 63,536.

During ancient times, the site was the location of the Roman camp Apulum. Since the High Middle Ages, the city has been the seat of Transylvania's Roman Catholic diocese. Between 1526 and 1570 it was the capital of the Eastern Hungarian Kingdom from which the Principality of Transylvania emerged by the Treaty of Speyer in 1570 and it was the capital of the Principality of Transylvania until 1711. At one point it also was a center of the Eastern Orthodox Metropolitan of Transylvania with suffragan to Vad diocese.<ref name=lb181216>Maksym Mayorov. Metropolitan of Kiev and other Eastern Orthodox Churches before 1686 (Київська митрополія та інші православні церкви перед 1686 роком ). Likbez. 16 December 2018</ref> On 1 December 1918, the Union of Transylvania with Romania was declared in Alba Iulia, and the Romania's King Ferdinand I and Queen Marie were crowned in the Alba Iulia Orthodox Cathedral, in 1922.

Alba Iulia is historically important for Romanians, Hungarians, and Transylvanian Saxons. In December 2018, Alba Iulia was officially declared Capital of the Great Union of Romania.

The city administers four villages: Bărăbanț (Borbánd), Micești (Ompolykisfalud), Oarda (Alsóváradja), and Pâclișa (Poklos).

 Names 

During the Roman period the settlement was called Apulum (from the Dacian Apoulon, mentioned by Ptolemy). When the settlement upon Roman ruins became the seat of a dukedom in the 10th century, the population may have been Slavic. From the 9th to the 11th century the settlement bore the Slavic name Bălgrad (meaning "white castle" or "white town"). The old Romanian name of the town was Bălgrad, originated from Slavic.

The Hungarian name Gyulafehérvár is a translation of the earlier Slavic form, meaning "white castle of the Gyula" or "white city of Julius". The current name, Alba Iulia, is a Romanian language translation of this. Alba, the Romanian feminine form of the word for White, and Iulia ("Julius") referring to Gyula, a mid-tenth-century Hungarian warlord who was baptized in Constantinople.

Among Ruthenians, the city was known as Bilhorod ("white city").

The city's Latin name in the 10th century was Civitatem Albam in Ereel. The first part of the name Alba denotes the ruins of the Roman fort Apulum (the pre-feudal white citadel).Romania in brief, Meridiane Pub. House, 1966, p. 74 Later in the Middle Ages, different names occurred as Frank episcopus Belleggradienesis in 1071, Albae Civitatis in 1134, Belegrada in 1153, Albensis Ultrasilvanus in 1177, eccl. Micahelis in 1199, Albe Transilvane in 1200, Albe Transsilvane in 1201, castrum Albens in 1206, canonicis Albensibus in 1213, Albensis eccl. Transsylvane in 1219, B. Michaelis arch. Transsilv. in 1231, Alba... Civitas in 1242, Alba sedes eptus in 1245, Alba Jula in 1291, Feyrvar in 1572, Feyérvár in 1574, Weissenburg in 1576, Belugrad in 1579, Gyula Feyervár in 1619, Gyula Fehérvár in 1690, and Karlsburg in 1715.

Under the influence of the Hungarian Gyulafehérvár, the town's Latin name eventually became Alba Julia or Alba Yulia. Its modern name Alba Iulia is an adoption of the town's medieval Latin name. It started to spread in Romanian common speech in the 18th century. The modern name has been officially used since the town became part of Romania.

The sixteenth-century German name was Weyssenburg. The Saxons later renamed the town to Karlsburg (Carlsburg) in honor of Charles VI (1685–1740).The Transylvanian Saxons: historical highlights, Alliance of Transylvanian Saxons, 1982, p. 55,  In Yiddish and Hebrew Karlsburg was prevalent; in Ladino sources Carlosburg. Alba Carolina was also a medieval Latin form of its name.

History

Ancient times

The modern city is located near the site of the important Dacian political, economic and social centre of Apulon, which was mentioned by the ancient Greek geographer Ptolemy and believed by some archaeologists to be the Dacian fortifications on top of Piatra Craivii. After Dacia became a province of the Roman Empire, the capital of Dacia Apulensis was established here, and the city was known as Apulum. Apulum was the largest city in Roman Dacia and was the seat of the XIII Gemina Legion. Apulum is the largest castrum located in Romania, occupying  (750 x 500 m2).

Middle Ages

The Gesta Hungarorum mentions a Hungarian regent named Jula or Geulathe maternal grandfather of Stephen I of Hungary and lord [regent] of Transylvaniawho built the capital of his dukedom there during the 10th century. Geula was baptized in the Byzantine Empire and built around 950 in Alba Iulia the first church of Transylvania. The ruins of a church were discovered in 2011. According to Ioan Aurel Pop and other historians, here lived Hierotheos the first bishop of Transylvania,I. Strajan, Adevărul istoric a învins la Alba Iulia, Despre prima organizare creştină din Transylvania – sec. X, "DACOROMANIA" nr.55/2011 who accompanied Geula back to Hungary after Geula had been baptized in Constantinople around 950.

After Stephen I adopted Catholicism, and the establishment of the Catholic Transylvanian bishopric, recent archaeological discoveries suggest that the first cathedral was built in the 11th century or possibly before. The present Catholic cathedral was built in the 12th or 13th century. In 1442, John Hunyadi, Voivode of Transylvania, used the citadel to prepare for a major battle against the Ottoman Turks. The cathedral was enlarged during his reign and he was entombed there after his death.

Ottoman and Habsburg period
In 1542 — after the partition of the Kingdom of Hungary — Alba Iulia became the capital of Transylvania and some of its neighboring territories to the west (later known as Partium), the autonomous Principality of Transylvania, and remained so until 1690. The Treaty of Weissenburg was signed in the town in 1551. During the reign of Prince Gábor Bethlen, the city reached a high point in its cultural history with the establishment of an academy. The former Ottoman Turkish equivalent was Erdel Belgradı or Belgrad-ı Erdel ("Belgrade of Transylvania" in English) where Erdel (Erdély) was added to prevent confusion with Belgrat and Arnavut Belgradı ("Albanian Belgrade" in Turkish, early name of Berat during Ottoman rule).

In 29 November 1599, Michael the Brave, Voivode of Wallachia, entered Alba Iulia following his victory in the Battle of Șelimbăr and became Voivode of Transylvania. In 1600 he gained control of Moldavia, uniting the principalities of Wallachia, Moldavia and Transylvania under his rule, which lasted for a year and a half until he was murdered in 1601, by General Giorgio Basta's agents.

Alba Iulia became part of the Habsburg Monarchy in 1690. The fortress Alba Carolina, designed by architect Giovanni Morando Visconti, was built between 1716 and 1735, at the behest of Emperor Charles VI of Habsburg. The leaders of the Transylvanian peasant rebellion were executed in Alba Iulia in January 1785. Important milestones in the city's development include the creation of the Batthyaneum Library in 1780 and the arrival of the railway in the 19th century.

20th and 21st centuries
At the end of World War I, representatives of the Romanian population of Transylvania, the National Assembly of Romanians of Transylvania and Hungary, gathered in Alba Iulia on 1 December 1918 during the so-called Great National Assembly of Alba Iulia to proclaim the Union of Transylvania with the Kingdom of Romania. The representatives of the Transylvanian Saxons decided to join this declaration on 8 January 1919.

In 1922, Ferdinand I of Romania was symbolically crowned King of Romania in Alba Iulia. In October 2012, at the 90th anniversary of King Ferdinand's coronation, his great-granddaughter Princess Margarita of Romania visited Alba Iulia to commemorate the event.

Jewish history

The Jewish community, which was the first in Transylvania, was established in the mid-16th century. In the 17th century, a Sephardic community was founded. The 18th century saw an influx of Ashkenazim from Hungary and Wallachia, as well as Sephardim. From 1754 to 1868, the town rabbi was the chief rabbi of Transylvania. A synagogue was built in 1840, with a Sephardic one following in 1874. Most local Jews in the 19th century worked in viticulture and bought land for growing vines; in the 20th century, they were mainly artisans. By 1930, the 1558 Jews of Alba Iulia represented nearly 13% of the town's population.

In October 1940, during the National Legionary State, the Iron Guard terrorized local Jews. The following year, the Ion Antonescu regime confiscated Jewish property and sent the men to forced labor. After World War II, the community was re-established but soon dwindled as Jews emigrated.

Climate
Alba Iulia has a humid continental climate (Cfb in the Köppen climate classification).

Landmarks

The main historical area of Alba Iulia is the Upper Town region, developed by Charles VI, Holy Roman Emperor in honour of whom the Habsburgs renamed the city Karlsburg. The fortress, with seven bastions in a stellar shape, was constructed between 1716 and 1735 by two Swiss fortification architects. The first was Giovanni Morandi Visconti, who built two old Italian-style bastions. The second was Nicolaus Doxat de Demoretnicknamed "Austrian Vauban". After 1720, the two architects radically transformed the medieval fortress shaped by the former Roman castrum into a seven-bastion baroque fortress, developing Menno van Coehorn's new Dutch system, of which the fortress of Alba Iulia is the best preserved example.

Inside the fortress are The Union Hall with the National Honour Gallery, The National History Museum of Unification, the Princely Palace (Voivodal Palace), the Orthodox cathedral, the Roman Catholic cathedral, the Batthyaneum Library, the Roman Catholic bishop's palace, the Apor Palace, and the University of Alba Iulia. Built in the 10th and 11th centuries, the Roman Catholic cathedral is the most representative building in the medieval Romanic style in Transylvania, and is considered to be an important monument of early Transylvanian medieval architecture. The tombs of John Hunyadi and Isabella JagiełłoQueen of Hungary are located there.

The Batthyaneum Library is held in a former church built in Baroque style. In 1780, Ignác Batthyány, bishop of Transylvania, adapted the inside of the building for use as a library. It is famous for its series of manuscripts, incunabula and rare bookssuch as half of the 9th century Codex Aureus of Lorsch, the 15th century Codex Burgundus and the 13th century Biblia Sacra (13th century). The first astronomical observatory in Transylvania was founded here in 1792. The Apor Palace, situated on the same street as the Bathyaneum Library, belonged to Prince Apor and was built in the second half of the 17th century. At the beginning of the 18th century it was the residence of the Austrian army leader Prince Steinville. The palace was renovated in 2007 under the supervision of the Romanian Ministry of Culture.

The Orthodox Unification Cathedral was built between 1921 and 1923, following the plans of architect D.G. Ștefănescu and built under the supervision of eng. T. Eremia. The frescoes were painted by Constantin in a traditional iconographic style. The first monarchs of the Unified Romania, King Ferdinand I and Queen Marie were crowned in the cathedral on 15 October 1922.

The National Museum of Unification in Alba Iulia is located in the "Babylon" Building. It was built between 1851 and 1853 for military purposes and became a museum in 1887. The museum exhibits over 130,000 pieces of artworks, organized chronologically. The Unification Hall, also part of the National History Museum, retains historical significance from having hosted, on 1 December 1918, the rally of the 1228 Romanian delegations from Transylvania who determined the province's union with the Kingdom of Romania. The building was used in 1895 as a military casino.

The Princely Palace (Palatul Principilor or Palatul Voievodal) was Michael the Brave's residence during the first political unification of the Romanians in 1600. Foreign chronicles pictured it as an extremely luxurious building, richly adorned with frescos and marble stairs, which later deteriorated. During the rule of Princes Gábor Bethlen and George II Rákóczi the second palace was restored, but not to its previous condition. After 1716, the building was used as an Habsburg Imperial Army barracks.

 Natives 

 Francis I Rákóczi (1645–1676), elected prince of Transylvania
 Michael II Apafi (1676–1713), Prince of Transylvania 1690 to 1699
 Ernst Michael Mangel (1800–1887), musician and Philhellene
 Rudolf Züllich (1813–1890), sculptor
 Alexandru Borza (1887–1971), botanist and monk
 Ernest Krausz (1931–2018), Israeli professor of sociology and President at Bar Ilan University
 Dan Eugen Demco (1942–), physicist and member of the Romanian Academy
 Ion Mărgineanu (1949–), writer and poet
 Marius Moga (1981–), producer, composer, and singer

 Other notable residents 

 Johann Heinrich Alsted (1588–1638), German Calvinist minister and academic. Spent his last years and died there.
 David Friesenhausen (1756–1828), Jewish writer, mathematician, and rabbi. Retired and died there.

Twin towns – sister cities

Alba Iulia is twinned with:

 Aigio, Greece
 Alcalá de Henares, Spain
 Alessandria, Italy
 Arnsberg, Germany
 Biograd na Moru, Croatia
 Cetinje, Montenegro
 Chișinău, Moldova
 Düzce, Turkey
 Lanzhou, China
 Nof HaGalil, Israel

 Sliven, Bulgaria
 Székesfehérvár, Hungary
 Varese, Italy
 Viadana, Italy

 Demographics 

According to the 2011 census, there was a total population of 63,536 people living in this town. Of these, 95.3% were ethnic Romanians, 3.2% Romani, 1.9% Hungarians, and 0.2% Germans (more specifically Transylvanian Saxons).

In 1850, Alba Iulia had 5,408 inhabitants, 2,530 of them being Romanians (46.78%), 1,009 Hungarians (18.67%), 748 Germans/Transylvanian Saxons (13.83%), and 1,121 (20.73%) others.

In 1891, the city had 8,167 residents, of which 3,482 were Hungarians (42.63%), 3,426 Romanians (41.94%), and 867 Germans/Transylvanian Saxons (10.62%). By 1910 the number of inhabitants increased to 11,616. 5,226 of them were Hungarians (45%), 5,170 Romanians (44.51%), and 792 Germans/Transylvanian Saxons (6.82%). At the 1930 census, 34.7% of the population were Romanian Orthodox, 28.1% Romanian Greek Catholic, 12.9% Roman Catholic, 12.7% Jews, 7.3% Reformed Protestant, 3.1% Lutheran.

Panoramas

Image gallery

Citations

Secondary sources
 Makkai, László (2001). "Transylvania in the medieval Hungarian kingdom (896–1526)", In: Béla Köpeczi, Historyof Transylvania Volume I: From the Beginnings to 1606'', Columbia University Press, New York, 2001,

External links

 Official site
 Alba Iulia photo gallery 

 
Populated places in Alba County
Cities in Romania
Fortified settlements
Roman sites in Romania
Roman towns and cities in Romania
Localities in Transylvania
Former capitals of Hungary
Capitals of Romanian counties
Capitals of the Principality of Transylvania
Roman legionary fortresses in Romania